Niels Christian Gauslaa Danbolt (5 November 1900 – 4 September 1984) was a Norwegian professor of medicine who was a specialist in skin diseases. Danbolt-Closs syndrome (acrodermatitis enteropathica) was named after him and Karl Philipp Closs.

Danbolt was born in Bergen, Norway. He was the son of Ole Dominicus Danielsen (1863-1941) and Gesine Gauslaa (1866-1964). He was the brother of the missionary priest Lars Johan Danbolt  and theology professor Erling Danbolt. He was the uncle of  professor  Ole Danbolt Mjøs  and professor Gunnar Danbolt . His sister Johanna Sophie Danbolt was married to Bishop Olav Hagesæther. 

Danbolt  was cand.med. in 1925 and took the dr.med. degree at the University of Oslo  in 1932. He studied in Zurich in 1934, Freiburg in 1936 and in the United States in 1946. He served multiple years as chairman of the Norwegian Dermatological Association.  He served as a chief physician at Rikshospitalet as well as professor at the University of Oslo from 1936 to 1970.

References

1900 births
1984 deaths
Norwegian dermatologists
Academic staff of the University of Oslo
Oslo University Hospital people
Physicians from Bergen